Norristown Line could refer to:

 the Norristown Branch, a physical railway line owned by SEPTA
 the Manayunk/Norristown Line, a commuter rail service that uses the Norristown Branch
 the Norristown High Speed Line, an interurban rapid transit service